Christopher is the English version of a Europe-wide name derived from the Greek name Χριστόφορος (Christophoros or Christoforos). The constituent parts are Χριστός (Christós), "Christ" or "Anointed", and φέρειν (phérein), "to bear"; hence the "Christ-bearer".

As a given name, 'Christopher' has been in use since the 10th century.
In English, Christopher may be abbreviated as "Chris", "Topher", and sometimes "Kit".
It was frequently the most popular male first name in the United Kingdom, having been in the top twenty in England and Wales from the 1940s until 1995, although it has since dropped out of the top 100.  The name is most common in England and not so common in Wales, Scotland, or Ireland.

People with the given name

Antiquity and Middle Ages
 Saint Christopher (died 251), saint venerated by Catholics and Orthodox Christians
 Christopher (Domestic of the Schools) (fl. 870s), Byzantine general
 Christopher Lekapenos (died 931), Byzantine co-emperor
 Christopher of Antioch (died 967), Greek Orthodox patriarch of Antioch
 Christopher I of Denmark (1219–1259), King of Denmark (1252–1259)
 Christopher II of Denmark (1276-1332), King of Denmark (1320–1326, 1329–1332)
 Christopher of Bavaria (1416–1448), union king of Denmark (1440–1448), Sweden (1441–1448), and Norway (1442–1448)
 Christopher of Werle (died 1425), Prince of the Wends
 Christopher Columbus (1451–1506), Italian navigator, explorer, and colonizer who captained the first European ship to reach the Americas

Modern
Christopher (singer) (born 1992), Danish singer
Christopher, Count of Oldenburg (c. 1504–1566)
Christopher, Duke of Brunswick-Harburg (1570–1606)
Christopher, Duke of Mecklenburg (1537–1592)
Christopher of Greece and Denmark (1888–1940), prince, son of George I, King of Greece
Christopher of Prague (born 1953), primate-elect of the Church of the Czech Lands and Slovakia
Christopher Abbott (born 1986), American actor 
Christopher J. Alexis Jr. (born 1996), Grenadian road cyclist
Christopher Awdry (born 1940), English author is best known for his contributions to The Railway Series of books featuring Thomas the Tank Engine
Christopher Bartley (born 1963), American psychologist
Christopher Bengtsson (born 1993), Swedish professional ice hockey player
Chris Broach (born 1976), American musician, songwriter, and recording artist.
Chris Brown (born 1989), American singer and songwriter
Christopher Cerf (born 1941), American author, composer-lyricist, voice actor, and record and television producer
Christopher Chung (born 1998), Australian-born Hong Kong professional footballer
Kris Clyburn (born 1996), American basketball player for Maccabi Rishon LeZion of the Israeli Basketball Premier League
 Christopher Comstock (born 1992), American electronic music producer and DJ, better known by his stage name Marshmello
Chris Cornell (born 1964) American musician, songwriter, singer, rhythm guitarist and recording artist
Christopher Cradock (1862–1914), English Royal Navy officer
Christopher Cross (born 1950), American musician
Christopher Dorner (1973–2013), American former LA police officer and spree killer
Christopher Doyle (born 1952), Australian-Hong Kong cinematographer
Christopher Eccleston (born 1964), English actor
Chris Evans (born 1981), American actor
Christopher R. Fee, American medievalist
Christopher Ford, American screenwriter
Christopher E. Gerty (born 1975), American aerospace engineer and aquanaut
Christopher Lawrence "Bong" Go (born 1974), Filipino politician
Christopher Guarin, Filipino journalist who was murdered
Sir Christopher Hatton (1540-1591), English politician and 'favourite' of Queen Elizabeth 1st
Christopher Hinton (disambiguation), multiple people
Chris Daugherty (born 1970), American construction worker and reality TV personality
Chris Hemsworth (born 1983), Australian actor
Christopher Hitchens (1949–2011), English American author and journalist
Christopher Isherwood (1904–1986), English American novelist
Christopher Allan Hector Perera Jayawardena, Sri Lankan Sinhala army officer
Christopher Katongo (born 1982), Zambian international footballer
Christopher Lee (disambiguation)
Kristoffer Lindberg (born 1992), Swedish politician
Christopher Lloyd (born 1938), American actor
Christopher Lloyd (screenwriter) (born 1960), American screenwriter
Christopher Maloney (English singer) (born 1977), British singer-songwriter
Christopher Marlowe (1564–1593), English dramatist
Christopher Anthony John "Chris" Martin (born 1977), English musician, singer, songwriter, record producer, and philanthropist.
Christopher Meloni (born 1961), American actor
Christopher Messina (born 1981), American inventor of the hashtag
Christopher Robin Milne (1920–1996), English son of author A. A. Milne
Christopher Morley (1890–1957), American journalist, novelist, essayist, and poet
Christopher Newsom (1983–2007), American murder victim
Christopher Nolan (born 1970), British-American film director and producer
Christopher Norris (actress), American actress
Christopher Nowinski (born 1978), American professional wrestler
Christopher Ober (born 1954), Canadian-American material scientist
Christopher Ondaatje (born 1933), Sri Lankan Briton businessman and adventurer
Christopher O'Neill (born 1974), husband of Princess Madeleine of Sweden
Christopher Paolini (born 1983), American author
Christopher Stuart Patterson (born 1842), American Dean of the University of Pennsylvania Law School
Christopher Pike (author) (born 1954), American author
Chris Pine (born 1980), American actor
Christopher Pratt (born 1935), Canadian painter and printmaker
Chris Pratt (born 1979), American actor
Christopher Plummer (1929–2021), Canadian actor
Christopher Reeve (1952–2004), American actor
Christopher Ruocchio, American author and editor
Christopher Samba (born 1984), former Blackburn Rovers Captain
Christopher Scarver (born 1969), American robber and serial killer; best known for killing Jeffrey Dahmer
Christopher Smart (1722–1771), English poet
Christopher Smith (disambiguation), multiple people
Chris Squire (1948-2015), English bassist (Yes)
Christopher Tingley (born c. 1950), Arabic translator
Christopher Tolkien (1924–2020), third and youngest son of the author J. R. R. Tolkien
Christopher Tsui, Hong Kong-based businessman and a Champion Thoroughbred racehorse owner
Christopher Walken (born 1943), American actor
Chris Whelpdale (born 1987), English professional footballer
Christopher Wilder (1945–1984), American serial killer and rapist
Christopher Woodrow (born 1977), American movie producer
Christopher Wren (1632–1723), English architect

People with the surname 
 Alvin Christopher, first elected to office as an independent in 1995
 Ann Christopher (born 1947), British sculptor
 Anthony (Tony) Christopher (born 1952), CEO and president of Landmark Entertainment Group
 Bostin Christopher, American actor
 Byron Christopher (born 1949), Canadian news reporter
 Chigozie Christopher (born 1992), Nigerian footballer
 Dennis Christopher (born Dennis Carrelli, 1955), American actor
 Joseph Christopher (1955–1993), American serial killer
 Josh Christopher (born 2001), American basketball player
 Ted Christopher (1958–2017), American racing driver
 Tony Christopher, Baron Christopher (born 1925), British businessman, trade unionist, and tax official
 Warren Christopher (1925–2011), 63rd United States Secretary of State
 William Christopher (1932–2016), American actor

Fictional characters 
 Christopher Da Silva, a character from the Silent Hill film franchise.
 Christopher Ewing, a character from the American TV series Dallas
 Christopher Gardener, the main character from the 2006 film The Pursuit of Happyness
 Christopher “Chris” Halliwell, son of main character Piper Halliwell of Charmed.
 Christopher "Chris" Myers, character from The Promise (2016)
 Christopher "Chris" Kirkman, a character in Bravest Warriors
 Christopher Moltisanti, a character from the American TV series The Sopranos
 Christopher Pike, captain of the U.S.S. Enterprise NCC-1701 immediately prior to James T. Kirk, from the Star Trek franchise including the Original Series, the 2009 film by J. J. Abrams, the second season of Star Trek: Discovery, and the upcoming series Star Trek: Strange New Worlds.
 Christopher Robin, a character from the 1926 novel Winnie the Pooh and its franchise
 Christopher "Chris" Traeger, a character from the American TV series Parks and Recreation
 Christopher Turk, a character from the American television series Scrubs
 Peter Christopher, lead character in the 1960s TV sitcom Occasional Wife
 Christopher "Kit" Walker, the real name of the comic character The Phantom
 Christopher Wilde, a character from the 2010 film Starstruck

Cognates in other languages 

Afrikaans: Christoffel, Christoforus
Albanian: Kristofer, Kristofor, Kristoforid, Kristo
Arabic: كريستوفر (Krīstafor, Kristūfar, Krístufer), اصطفر (ʔiṣṭufur, ʔiṣṭafur), عبد المسيح (ʕabdu l-masīḥ), خريستو (Ḵrīstū, Ḵrīstaw, Ḵrīstau)
Aragonese: Cristofo
Azerbaijani: Kristofer
Armenian: Քրիստափոր (Christapor, Krisdapor)
Basque: Kristobal
Belarusian: Крыстафер (Krystafier)
Bengali: ক্রিস্টোফার (Krisţophar)
Breton: Kristof, Kristol
Bulgarian: Кристофър (Christofr), Христофор ("Khristofór")
Catalan: Cristòfor
Chinese: 克里斯托弗 (Kèlǐsītuōfú), 克里斯多夫(Kèlǐsīduōfū), 克里斯多福 ("Kèlǐsīduōfú)
Cornish: Kitto
Corsican: Cristofanu
Croatian: Kristofor
Czech: Kryštof
Danish: Christoffel, Christoffell, Christoffer, Christofher, Christopher, Chriztoffer, Kristofer, Kristofers, Kristoffer, Kristoofer, Kristopher
Dutch: Christoffel, Christoforus, Christophe, Kristof
Esperanto: Kristoforo
Estonian: Christoph, Kristof, Kristofer, Kristoffer, Risto
Faroese: Kristoffur
Finnish: Kristoffer, Risto
Flemish: Christoffel, Kristof
French: Christophe
Galician: Cristovo
Genoese: Christoffa
German: Christoph, Christof, Christoffer
Georgian: ქრისტეფორე (K'ristep'ore)
Greek: Χριστόφορος (Christóphoros)
Gujarati: ક્રિસ્ટોફર (Krisṭōphara)
Haitian Creole: Kristòf
Hawaiian: Kilikopela, 'Imiloa (direct translation)
Hebrew: כריסטופר (Kristofer)
Hindi: क्रिस्टोफर (Krisṭōphar)
Hungarian: Kristóf, Krisztofer
Icelandic: Kristófer
Irish: Críostóir
Italian: Cristoforo
Japanese: クリストファー (Kurisutofā)
Kannada: ಕ್ರಿಸ್ಟೋಫರ್ (Krisṭōphar)
Korean: 크리스토퍼 (Keuriseutopeo)
Latin: Christopherus, Christophorus
Latvian: Kristaps, Kristofers
Lithuanian: Kristoforas, Kristupas
Macedonian: Кристофер (Kristofer)
Malayalam: ക്രിസ്റ്റഫർ (Kristaphar)
Maltese: Kristofru, Ħamallu
Marathi: ख्रिस्तोफर (Khristōphar)
Middle English: Cristofre
Mongolian: Кристофер (Kristofyer)
Nepali: क्रिस्टोफर (Krisṭōphar)
Norwegian: Kristoffer
Occitan: Cristòl
Persian: کریستوفر
Polish: Krzysztof
Portuguese: Cristóvão
Romanian: Hristofor
Russian: Христофо́р (Khristofór)
Sami: Doffá
Sardinian: Cristolu
Scottish Gaelic: Crìsdean
Serbian: Христофор (Hristofor)
Sicilian: Cristòfuru
Slovak: Krištof
Slovenian: Krištof
Sorbian: Kito
Spanish: Cristóbal, Cristo, Tobolito, Cristóforo
Swahili: Gitte
Swedish: Christoffer, Kristoffer
Tamil: கிறிஸ்டோபர் (Kiṟisṭōpar)
Telugu: క్రిస్టోఫర్ (Krisṭōphar)
Thai:  คริสโตเฟอร์ (Kristofeʼr)
Turkish: Kristof
Ukrainian: Христофор (Khrystofor), Криштоф (Kryshtof'')
Urdu: کرسٹوفر
Venetian: Cristoforo
Vietnamese: Kristoffer, Christopher
Welsh: Cristoffis
Yiddish: טשריסטאָפער (Tshristofer)

See also
Christoph, a given name and surname
Christophers, a surname
Kester (name), a given name and surname

References 

Given names of Greek language origin
Unisex given names
English given names
English-language unisex given names
English unisex given names